Aer Lingus Flight 164 was a scheduled Boeing 737 passenger flight that was hijacked on 2 May 1981, en route from Dublin Airport in Ireland to London Heathrow Airport in the United Kingdom.

Hijacking 
While on approach to Heathrow, about five minutes before the flight was due to land, a 55-year-old Australian named Laurence James Downey went into the toilet and doused himself in petrol. He then went to the cockpit and demanded that the plane continue on to Le Touquet – Côte d'Opale Airport in France, and refuel there for a flight to Tehran, Iran. Upon landing at Le Touquet, Downey further demanded the publication in the Irish press of a nine-page statement which he had the captain throw from the cockpit window.

Standoff 
After an eight-hour standoff (during which time Downey released 11 of his 112 hostages), French special forces stormed the plane and apprehended Downey. No shots were fired and nobody was injured. It was later found out that Downey was being sought by police in Perth, Australia, in connection with a $70,000 land fraud incident, and was also wanted in Shannon, Ireland, for alleged assault.  He was sentenced in February 1983, in Saint-Omer, France, to five years' imprisonment for air piracy.

Hijacker 
In his statement, Downey claimed to have been a Trappist monk in residence at Tre Fontane Abbey in the 1950s (this was later confirmed by monastery officials), before he was expelled from the order for punching a superior in the face. He then took a job as a tour guide in central Portugal, at a shrine devoted to Our Lady of Fátima (who had, many decades previous, appeared before three children and shared with them what was to become known as the three secrets of Fatima). At the time of the hijacking, the third secret was known only to the Pope and other senior figures in the Catholic Church; Downey's statement called on the Vatican to release this secret to the public.

References 

Aircraft hijackings in the United Kingdom
Accidents and incidents involving the Boeing 737 Original
164
Aviation accidents and incidents in 1981
Aviation accidents and incidents in France
Aviation accidents and incidents in England
1981 in France
1981 in Ireland
May 1981 events in Europe
Airliner accidents and incidents in the United Kingdom